Styrax foveolaria is a species of tree in the family Styracaceae. It is native to Peru, Ecuador and Colombia.

References

tomentosus
Vulnerable plants
Trees of Peru
Trees of Ecuador
Trees of Colombia
Taxa named by Aimé Bonpland